Kamal Deshapriya Sirisena (කමල් දේශප්‍රිය), is an actor in Sri Lankan cinema and television, as well as a television host, cricket commentator and media personality.

Personal life
His father Ananda Sirisena was a radio artist. His mother Agnes Tissera (b. 1928) was an actress and radio artist. He completed education from Nalanda College, Colombo.

Career
In 2017 he was appointed channel head of Sri Lanka Cricket (SLC). In February 2018 he resigned from the post by citing personal reasons. Several reports informed that the resignation was due to disputes over match telecasting rights with SLC deputy secretary, Ravin Wickramaratne. He also worked as a co-coordinating secretary of National Movement Against Terrorism (NMAT) and as the Sihala Urumaya Spokesman.

His first cinema acting role was in the 2014 film, Siri Daladagamanaya, directed by Sanath Abeysekara.

Television 

 Angana
 Chaya
 Doovili Sulanga
 Isuru Sangramaya
 Mal Deweta
 Maunayagaya
 Muhunu Potha
 Paththini
 Piyavi
 Sihina Aran Enna
 Teacher Amma 
 Vimansa
 Waluka
 Wasana Wewa

Filmography

References

External links
 Softlogic Life unveils ‘Premier Health Benefit’ scheme
 Seeing stars!

Sri Lankan male film actors
Sinhalese male actors
Sri Lankan Buddhists
Living people
Year of birth missing (living people)